The Stade Lat Dior is a multi-sports stadium in Thiès, Senegal. The stadium is named in honour of Lat Jor.

It has a capacity of 10,000 spectators. The capacity was 20,000 before the installation of seats.

References 

Lat-Dior